Anh Dao Traxel (Vietnamese spelling: Anh Đào Traxel; born Dương Anh Đào; born 22 August 1957 in Saigon, South Vietnam) is the foster daughter of the late French President Jacques Chirac (1932–2019) and his wife Bernadette (born 1933). She was a boat-person refugee, and met Jacques Chirac at Roissy Airport in 1979. He told her "Don’t cry, ma chérie. You are coming home with us" and took her home. She was then 21 and her adoptive father was 47.

She spent two years in the home of the Chiracs. Mrs. Traxel was married twice. Her second husband, Emmanuel Traxel, is a police lieutenant. She has four children, Bernard-Jacques, Laurence-Claude, Jacques and Cassandre. The children called Jacques Chirac Grandpa. She is now the President of a European association of assistance to the families of civil servants who died during their service (Étoile européenne du dévouement civil et militaire).

Awards and honours

French honours
 Légion d'honneur, Chevalier (Knight) — since 2009.

Foreign honours
Commandeur de l'Étoile de Mohéli (Comoros)
Chevalier de l'Étoile de la Grande Comore (known as Saïd Ali).

Further reading
La Fille de Cœur - Flammarion Ed. - 2006 -

Notes

French women writers
1957 births
Living people
French people of Vietnamese descent
Vietnamese writers
Chevaliers of the Légion d'honneur
Jacques Chirac
French-language literature of Vietnam
20th-century French women